Chandra Kintala (1948–2009) was a computer science researcher in New Jersey, United States and Bangalore, India from 2006–2009.

He worked at Bell Labs in AT&T, Lucent and Avaya in New Jersey, where he and  Dr. David Belanger invented  a language and a software tool used in AT&T for data analytics on very large databases.  With Dr. Yennun Huang, he worked on Software-implemented Fault Tolerance and Software Rejuvenation in the 1990s.  
He also worked in distributed systems and network software research at Bell Labs.

While working at Bell Labs, he held the titles of Adjunct Professor and later Distinguished Industry Professor at Stevens Institute of Technology in New Jersey.

India
In September 2006, he moved to India as the Director of Motorola Labs in Bangalore. In August 2008, he joined Yahoo! Labs in Bangalore where he held the position of the Director of System Sciences and Academic Relations in India.

Education
Kintala had a Ph.D. in Computer Science from Penn State University, an M. Tech. from Indian Institute of Technology, Kanpur, and a B.Tech. from National Institute of Technology, Rourkela, India.  He had published 48 refereed research papers and received 6 US patents and a Smithsonian medal sponsored by Computer World in 1998.

Conferences and memberships
He had been active at academic and industry conferences and associations:
General Chair of IEEE's conference on Dependable Systems and Networks in Philadelphia in June 2006
Acting Chair of IFIP WG1.2
Member of IFIP WG10.4
Senior member of IEEE
Keynote or guest speaker at several academic and industry events
Member of several technical program committees
Member of FICCI and Pacific Council's Joint Task Force on Global Innovation Economy – Enhancing India-US Relations.

Death
Kintala had a heart attack and died on 5 November 2009 at Summit, New Jersey. He is survived by his wife Bharti and his two children.

Obituary
NJ Obituary
Higgins Funeral Home

References

External links 
List of Publications
Personal page
Stevens Institute of Technology
Smart Techie article on Kintala

Pennsylvania State University alumni
Scientists at Bell Labs
Indian computer scientists
Stevens Institute of Technology faculty
2009 deaths
Avaya employees
Senior Members of the IEEE
IIT Kanpur alumni
1948 births
Scientists from Bangalore
Indian American